The Key First Nation is a band government in southern Saskatchewan, Canada. Their reserves include:

 The Key 65
 Treaty Four Reserve Grounds 77, shared with 32 other bands.

Chiefs

This First nation band, led by Chief Ow-tah-pee-ka-kaw (“He Who unlocks” or “The Key”, the namesake of the modern First Nation), signed Treaty 4 with the representatives of the Crown on September 24, 1875. 

The Federation of Saskatchewan Indian Nations Chiefs Assembly honoured Gwendolyn Lucy O'Soup Crane for her lifetime achievements and recognized her as Canada's first female, First Nations Chief (of The Key First Nation), and the first elected under the current electoral system.

References

First Nations in Saskatchewan